The Kambara nritham or Kambara dance is a folk dance performed by the Adiyan tribe of Wayanad, a northern district of the state of Kerala. In this artform, men sing folk songs and play wind and percussion instruments, while women dance near the paddies where saplings are collected.

See also
Folk dance in India

References

Folk dances of Kerala